The Costume Designers Guild Award for Excellence in Period Costume Design for Television Series was awarded for the first time in 2000, honoring 1999 television. While it did honor period costumes, it also honored fantasy television, and the award was titled Costume Designers Guild Award for Excellence in Period/Fantasy Television Series. Those two genres were separated into their own awards categories in 2016, resulting in the current award designation.

Winners

1990s
Excellence in Period/Fantasy for Television

2000s

2010s

Excellence in Period Television

2020s

Programs with multiple awards

2 awards
 Boardwalk Empire (HBO)
 The Crown (Netflix)
 Downton Abbey (PBS)
 Mad Men (AMC)
 The Marvelous Mrs. Maisel (Amazon)
 Rome (HBO)
|}

Programs with multiple nominations

6 nominations
 Mad Men (AMC)

5 nominations
 Boardwalk Empire (HBO)

4 nominations
 Game of Thrones (HBO)
 That '70s Show (Fox)
 The Tudors (Showtime)

3 nominations
 Cold Case (CBS)
 The Crown (Netflix)
 Deadwood (HBO)
 GLOW (Netflix)
 The Marvelous Mrs. Maisel (Amazon)

2 nominations
 The Borgias (Showtime)
 Carnivàle (HBO)
 Downton Abbey (PBS)
 The Knick (Cinemax)
 Masters of Sex (Showtime)
 Outlander (Starz)
 Penny Dreadful (Showtime)
 Pushing Daisies (ABC)
 Rome (HBO)
 Stranger Things (Netflix)
 Westworld (HBO)

References

Costume Designers Guild Awards